Witness is the third studio album by Danish metal band Vola, released on 21 May 2021 through Mascot Records. The record became their first top-ten album on the UK Rock Albums chart, and charted across Europe, including Germany, Finland and Switzerland.

It was elected by Loudwire as the 17th best rock/metal album of 2021.

Track listing

Charts

References

2020 albums
Vola (band) albums
Mascot Records albums